Raja Bhagwant Das (1527 – 4 December 1589) was the 23rd Kacchwaha ruler of Amber. His sister, Mariam-uz-Zamani, was the chief consort of Emperor Akbar and mother of his successor, Emperor Jahangir. His son, Man Singh I, one of the Navaratnas of Akbar became the highest-ranking official of his court and his daughter, Man Bai, was the first and chief wife of Prince Salim (later Jahangir).

Life

Raja Bhagwant Das was the eldest son of Raja Bharmal born in 1527 to his wife Phulvati of Mandore.

At the event of his sister's marriage to Akbar in 1562, he was taken into the royal service by Akbar. He led several military expeditions of the Mughal Empire and was a respected noble in the Mughal court. He was notable for his sincere devotion and loyalty to Akbar having saved his life in the battle of Paronkh taking the bow meant to strike Akbar, on his chest.

Bhagwant Das was one of the generals of Akbar, who awarded him a mansab (rank) of 5000 in 1585. and conferred him the title of Amir-ul-Umra. He fought many battles for Akbar, including battles in Punjab, Kashmir, and Afghanistan, and was also the governor of Kabul. Bhagwant Das soundly defeated the army of the Kashmiri king, Yousuf Shah Chak.

He married his daughter, Man Bai, to Prince Salim, who later assumed the throne as emperor Jahangir. Their child was Jahangir's eldest son, Khusrau Mirza.

Death
Shortly after attending the cremation of Todar Mal at Lahore, Bhagwant Das, having suffered from a bout of vomiting and strangury, died on 4 December 1589. At his time of time, Akbar issued a firman of condolence to his eldest son and successor, Man Singh I from Bhagawati Devi, in which were written king and gracious messages beyond all grounds and sent him with his own dresses of honor and a body-guardsman's horse. He further designated him the title of Raja at the account of his father's death. His second son, Madho Singh, became the ruler of Bhangarh.

Issue
Raja Bhagwant Das had at least thirteen sons:

Raja Man Singh  
Raikumvar Bai 
Man Bai
Raja Madho Singh
Pratap Singh
Kunwar Hardas Singh
Kunwar Kanah
Kunwar Vanmali Das 
Kunwar Bhiv
Chandarsera Singh
Bajresh Singh
Anupurva bai
Jijayi Ji bai
Sur Singh

Ancestry

References

Hindu monarchs
Maharajas of Jaipur
1589 deaths
16th-century Indian monarchs
Year of birth unknown
1537 births
People from Lahore